Robin Brooks (born 1961) is a British radio dramatist.

Robin Brooks may also refer to:

 Robin Brooks (fictional character), Numb3rs character
Robin Brooks (Miss California), Miss California
Robin Brook (river), a river in Derbyshire

See also
Robin Brook (1908–1998), British merchant banker
Robin Brooke (born 1966), New Zealand rugby player